WJJY-FM (106.7 FM) is a radio station that is located in Baxter, Minnesota, with an adult contemporary format.

WJJY-FM's sister stations include KVBR 1340, KLIZ 1380, KBLB 93.3, KUAL-FM 103.5, and KLIZ-FM 107.5. All of the aforementioned stations are located in a broadcast facility located at 13225 Dogwood Drive, Baxter.

WJJY-FM is not licensed by the FCC to broadcast in HD.

Hubbard Broadcasting, Inc. announced on November 13, 2014, that it would purchase the Omni Broadcasting stations, including WJJY-FM. The sale was completed on February 27, 2015, at a purchase price of $8 million for the 16 stations and one translator.

Programming
Every Saturday night, the station plays music from the 1980s entitled "All 80's Saturday Night".

The morning show from 5-9 AM is hosted by Ken Thomas, who may be better known for doing the stations' Cash Calls. Some of the clips from the Cash Call contestants over the years are part of classic bit used on KQRS-FM in Minneapolis titled the "Brainerd Cash Call".

Awards
The station was one of 10 stations awarded the 2007 Crystal Radio Award for public service awarded by the National Association of Broadcasters. Winners were honored at the Radio Luncheon on April 17, 2007, during the NAB Show in Las Vegas, Nevada.

References

External links
WJJY official website

Radio stations in Minnesota
Mainstream adult contemporary radio stations in the United States
Radio stations established in 1978
1978 establishments in Minnesota
Hubbard Broadcasting